Judith Ann Darragh  (born 1957) is a New Zealand artist who uses found objects to create sculptural assemblages. She has also worked in paint and film. Darragh is represented in a number of public collections in New Zealand. In 2004, The Museum of New Zealand Te Papa Tongarewa held a major retrospective of her work titled Judy Darragh: So... You Made It?

Early life and education 
Darragh was born and raised in Christchurch. Her mother worked in a clothing factory and her father was a freezing worker. Darragh has described being surrounded by "the joy of making" in her home environment, and from an early age she enjoyed drawing and making things from craft materials such as Fimo and pipe cleaners.

Darragh studied graphic design, graduating from Wellington Polytechnic with a Diploma in Visual Communication and Design in 1978. Deciding that she was not "cut out for the (graphic design) industry," Darragh moved to Auckland where she gained a Diploma in Teaching from Auckland Secondary School Teachers College in 1980. She has described how her teaching career has supported her art-making and provided her with a sense of freedom in her practice.

Artist-run initiatives 
In 1992 Darragh was one of eight artists who founded the artist-run space Teststrip in Auckland.  The artist-run space closed in 1997. Darragh then went on to start Cuckoo, an artist-run project based in Auckland that was described as 'the artist-run space without a space'  with four other artists in 2000.

Pornographic imagery 
In 2013 Darragh exhibited 'Doctor, 2013' at Gus Fisher Gallery in the show 'A Different view: artists address pornography'. The exhibition examined the impact of the pornography industry on New Zealand society and sought to open up a conversation about the 'silent business'. The artwork which she exhibited in this show (Doctor, 2013) was taken from a Hustler centrefold, then enlarged and printed onto a PVC skin which was a reference to the advertising industry. Previous work has also included assemblages with dildos (Mussell Mirror and Flicker of Life, 1987), as well as direct painting onto pornographic images using white-out.

Comic strips 
In the 1980s under the alias Blossom, Darragh's comic strips were published in the New Zealand underground comic book series Strips. Her comic strips have also been published in Three Words: An anthology of Aotearoa/NZ women's comics.

Shrine series 
Darragh developed her signature kitsch aesthetic while living in Auckland in the 1980s, where she was working as secondary school teacher. She began making and selling domestic objects such as lamps and mirrors made from plastic plates at Cook Street Market and collecting bric-a-brac from markets, second hand shops and op shops. Her first assemblage works brought together these made and found objects into what she has described as "shrines". She was interested in exploring the distinctions between high and low culture and art and craft (particularly crafts that have been historically undertaken by women) and was influenced by Marcel Duchamp and his use of the readymade. Darragh first exhibited her art at Artspace, in Auckland's George Fraser Gallery.

Honours and awards
In the 2020 Queen's Birthday Honours, Darragh was appointed an Officer of the New Zealand Order of Merit, for services to the arts.

Collections 
 Auckland Art Gallery
 Govett-Brewster Art Gallery
 Christchurch Art Gallery
 Dunedin Public Art Gallery
 Museum of New Zealand Te Papa Tongarewa
 Waikato Museum Te Whare Taonga o Waikato
 Lincoln University Collection, Christchurch
 Sarjeant Gallery Te Whare o Rehua, Whanganui

References

Further reading 

 Conland, Natasha. Judy Darragh: So...You Made It? Exhibition Catalogue. Wellington:  Te Papa Press, 2004.

External links 
 Judy Darragh's Website
 Judy Darragh, Artist: Studio Channel Art Fair 
 Judy Darragh talk at the SPARK International Festival of Media, Arts & Design at Waikato Institute of Technology, August 2012
 Judy Darragh on Radio New Zealand Arts on Sunday

New Zealand women photographers
1957 births
Artists from Christchurch
Living people
New Zealand women sculptors
New Zealand installation artists
20th-century New Zealand sculptors
21st-century New Zealand sculptors
20th-century New Zealand women artists
21st-century New Zealand women artists
Officers of the New Zealand Order of Merit
20th-century women photographers
21st-century women photographers